Piwnica Świdnicka (German: Schweidnitzer Keller), or Świdnicka Cellar in English, is a Polish restaurant company based in the medieval cellars of the Old Town Hall in Wrocław, Poland. It is the third oldest Polish company in existence as well as the oldest restaurant in Poland and one of the oldest in Europe, having been established in 1273 during Piast-ruled Kingdom of Poland.

The name comes from the nearby city of Świdnica, from which beer was delivered to the restaurant in the Middle Ages. Świdnica was a renowned brewing centre, and its beer was served in restaurants called "Świdnicka Cellars", which existed in large cities such as Kraków (Piwnica Świdnicka w Krakowie), Toruń, and Wrocław, the last of which still operates to this day.

Famous visitors 

On the wall is a table with the names of famous visitors including:
Sigismund, Holy Roman Emperor
Gotthold Ephraim Lessing
Joseph von Eichendorff
Józef Wybicki
August Heinrich Hoffmann von Fallersleben
Johann Wolfgang von Goethe
Frederic Chopin
Ferdinand Lassalle
Józef Ignacy Kraszewski
Juliusz Słowacki
Karl Eduard von Holtei
Gustav Freytag
Gerhart Hauptmann
Paul Keller
Otto Mueller
Hans Poelzig
Max Berg
Oskar Moll
Alfred Kerr
Paul Löbe
Hugo Hartung

See also 
List of oldest companies

References

External links 
Homepage in Polish
Facebook page

Restaurants in Poland
Tourist attractions in Poland
13th-century establishments in Poland
Buildings and structures in Wrocław